Journal of Language, Literature and Culture formerly known as Journal of the Australasian Universities Language and Literature Association or AUMLA (1953 –- 2012) is a triannual peer-reviewed literary journal published by Taylor & Francis Online on behalf of the Australasian Universities Language and Literature Association.

References

External links
Journal Homepage

Literary magazines published in Australia
Publications established in 1953
Academic journals of Australia
1953 establishments in Australia